William Stock, D.D. was an English priest and academic.

Stock was born in Herefordshire. A Fellow of Brasenose College, Oxford, he was the first Principal of  Gloucester Hall and the third president of St Johns. He held Livings at Sherborne, Gloucestershire, Minety, Marston Sicca, Crick, Northamptonshire, Ilmington, Freckenham, Idlicote, Northampton St. Peter and, Upton St. Michael. He died in 1607. . He graduated BA in 1736, and MA in 1740. He was ordained in 1744. At St John's he was logic reader from 1737 to 1740; dean of arts from 1740 to 1744; natural philosophy reader from 1745 to 1746; college preacher from 1746 to 1747; bursar from 1748 to 1749; dean of divinity from 1750 to 1754; and vice-president from 1755 to 1757.

References

1607 deaths
Fellows of Brasenose College, Oxford
People from Herefordshire
Presidents of St John's College, Oxford
Principals of Gloucester Hall, Oxford